Realidades (Eng.: Realities) is the title of a studio album released by Regional Mexican band Los Tigres del Norte. Realidades (Deluxe Edition) won a Grammy Award for Best Regional Mexican Music Album (including Tejano).

Pre-production started in the spring of 2014. Realidades and Realidades (Deluxe Edition) reached Billboard's Latin charts.  The hit single “La Bala” (The Bullet) was a follow up to the 2011 MTV Unplugged album.

Recognition 
Realidades (Deluxe Edition) won the Grammy Award for Best Regional Mexican Music Album (including Tejano) at the 58th Grammy Awards.

In 2015, “Era Diferente” (She Was Different) received the Special Recognition (Spanish Language) Award at the 26th annual GLAAD Media Awards.

Track listing

Credits 

 Alfonso Ródenas: Engineer
 Hernán Hernández: Band
 Jorge Hernández: Band
 Luis Hernández: Band
 Oscar Lara: Band
 Joseph Pope: Recording Assistant
 Brian (Bt) Gibbs: Recording Assistant

Charts

Weekly charts

Year-end charts

References 

2014 albums
Los Tigres del Norte albums
Fonovisa Records albums